Heppnerographa tricesimana is a species of moth of the family Tortricidae. It is found in Costa Rica, Panama, Guatemala, Ecuador, Brazil, Jamaica and Puerto Rico.

Adults are variable in size with a wingspan of 18–23 mm. It also varies in coloration, from paler to darker. Some specimens have distinct subterminal suffusion in the forewings or pale markings varying from pale ocherous to ferruginous. The subterminal dots are mostly whitish and distinctly dark edged.

References

Moths described in 1877
Heppnerographa